"Torches of Freedom" was a phrase used to encourage women's smoking by exploiting women's aspirations for a better life during the early twentieth century first-wave feminism in the United States. Cigarettes were described as symbols of emancipation and equality with men. The term was first used by psychoanalyst A. A. Brill when describing the natural desire for women to smoke and was used by Edward Bernays to encourage women to smoke in public despite social taboos. Bernays hired women to march while smoking their "torches of freedom" in the Easter Sunday Parade of 31 March 1929, which was a significant moment for fighting social barriers for women smokers.

History

Smoking as an inappropriate act for women
Before the twentieth century smoking was seen as a habit that was corrupt and inappropriate for women.  Dutch painters used cigarettes as a symbol of human foolishness in the 17th century and in the 19th century, cigarettes were perceived as props of "fallen women" and prostitutes. Women's smoking was seen as immoral and some states tried to prevent women from smoking by enforcing laws.  In 1904 a woman named Jennie Lasher was sentenced to thirty days in jail for putting her children's morals at risk by smoking in their presence and in 1908 the New York City Board of Aldermen unanimously passed an ordinance that prohibited smoking by women in public. Similarly in 1921 a bill was proposed to prohibit women from smoking in the District of Columbia.  Some women's groups also fought against women smoking. The International Tobacco League lobbied for filmmakers to refrain from putting women smoking cigarettes in movies unless the women being portrayed were of "discreditable" character and other women's groups asked young girls to sign pledges saying that they would not use tobacco.  These groups saw smoking as an immoral activity and a threat.  Yet during World War I as women took the jobs of men who had gone to war, they also began smoking even though it was still considered a taboo act.  Cigarettes were a way for women to challenge social norms and fight for equal rights as men.  Eventually for women the cigarette came to symbolize "rebellious independence, glamour, seduction and sexual allure for both feminists and flappers."

Advertising to women

Cigarette companies began selectively advertising to women in the late 1920s. In 1928 George Washington Hill, the president of the American Tobacco Company, realized the potential market that could be found in women and said, "It will be like opening a gold mine right in our front yard." Yet some women who were already smoking were seen as smoking incorrectly. In 1919 a hotel manager said that women "don't really know what to do with the smoke. Neither do they know how to hold their cigarettes properly.  Actually they make a mess of the whole performance." Tobacco companies had to make sure that women would not be ridiculed for using cigarettes in public and Philip Morris even sponsored a lecture series that taught women the "art of smoking".

To expand the number of women smokers Hill decided to hire Edward Bernays, who today is known as the father of public relations, to help him recruit women smokers. Bernays decided to attempt to eliminate the social taboo against women smoking in public. He gained advice from psychoanalyst A. A. Brill, who stated that it was normal for women to smoke because of oral fixation and said, "Today the emancipation of women has suppressed many of their feminine desires. More women now do the same work as men do. Many women bear no children; those who do bear have fewer children. Feminine traits are masked. Cigarettes, which are equated with men, become torches of freedom." In 1929 Bernays decided to pay women to smoke their "torches of freedom" as they walked in the Easter Sunday Parade in New York. This was a shock because until that time, women were only permitted to smoke in certain places such as in the privacy of their own homes. He was very careful when picking women to march because "while they should be good looking, they should not look too model-y" and he hired his own photographers to make sure that good pictures were taken and then published around the world.  Feminist Ruth Hale also called for women to join in the march saying, "Women! Light another torch of freedom! Fight another sex taboo!" Once the footage was released, the women's walk was seen as a protest for equality and sparked discussion throughout the nation. The targeting of women in tobacco advertising led to higher rates of smoking among women. In 1923 women only purchased 5% of cigarettes sold; in 1929 that percentage increased to 12%, in 1935 to 18.1%, peaking in 1965 at 33.3%, and remained at this level until 1977.

1990s resurgence

In the 1990s, tobacco companies continued to advertise cigarettes as "torches of freedom" as they sought to expand their markets around the world. Such brands as Virginia Slims continued to put forward the idea of modernity and freedom in new markets. The use of this imagery when advertising the cigarette has been specifically targeted at women in countries where women are gaining more equality and liberation.
 
The images used in the advertising campaigns differ by region.  In Spain they use images of women in masculine jobs, such as a fighter pilot, to appeal to young women—and the smoking rates among young women in Spain increased from 17% in 1978 to 27% in 1997.  Tobacco companies are also using the cigarette as an image of emancipation in eastern and central Europe where cigarettes are shown as symbols of Western freedom.  In the 1990s Germany was a focus for advertising, and between 1993 and 1997 the smoking rates among women aged 12–25 in Germany went from 27% to 47% even though the increase in men's smoking for the same age group is much smaller.  In Japan, various cigarettes advertised to women have encouraged women to be unique.  A survey by the Japanese Ministry of Health and Welfare showed that between 1986 and 1999 smoking among women had increased from 10.5% to 23.2%.  Advertisements in South Africa have shown women crossing racial barriers as black women are shown accepting cigarettes from white men and in India women have been portrayed in Western clothes with cigarettes as a sign of liberation and upward mobility.  In Asia it is becoming more acceptable for women to smoke and this is leading to a greater demand.  Tobacco companies advertise to women around the world, showing cigarettes as symbols of upward mobility, gender equality and freedom.  The impacts of tobacco companies targeting women can be seen by the increase in the number of women who started smoking in recent years.

See also
 Nicotine marketing
 Women and smoking

References 

American phraseology
Feminism in the United States
Smoking in the United States
Propaganda in the United States
Flappers